Wolfe–Spence Programming Aptitude tests, or Wolfe–Spence tests, are a series of tests introduced in 1972 by Jack M. Wolfe, PhD, used to determine how likely a candidate is to succeed in further classes and tests. They are administrated by Walden Personnel Testing and Consulting Inc.

References

Psychological tests and scales